Crime in Latvia is usually low, compared to previous years, when it was named the "crime capital of Europe" by Forbes in 2008. The homicide rate in Latvia was 3.9 cases per 100,000 people in 2019, a sharp drop from 10 cases per 100,000 people in 2000, and has been steadily decreasing,  but has seen recent increases. The United States Department of State has assessed Latvia's security rating as "medium", with a moderate crime rate. In recent times, crime has been increasing, particularly due to many Latvians stranded because of the COVID-19 pandemic returning to Latvia and choosing to commit crime. According to Interpol, Latvia is considered a attractive place for regional and organized criminals involved in drug trafficking, arms trafficking, human trafficking, or smuggling. According to the Central Statistical Bureau of Latvia, a third of all women in Latvia suffer from some form of sexual violence or rape while men are subjected to violence outside the family.

Crime had seen massive increases in Latvia after the restoration of independence after end of the Soviet occupation. The market transition from a planned economy to a free market-economy caused great social uncertainty in Latvia, and the crime rates rose. The Latvian government defines crime as "an action endangering society and entailing criminal punishment whether committed intentionally or through negligence". The punishment for murder in Latvia is "deprivation of liberty" no lower than 3 years and no higher than 15 years. The highest punishment offered by the Republic of Latvia is life imprisonment, given only in extreme cases like terrorism. Crimes in Latvia have also been committed by other nations, like Nazi Germany and the Soviet Union during their respective occupations of Latvia in 1940 and 1941.

Types of crime 
The main types of crime common in Latvia include human trafficking, motor vehicle theft, and corruption. Other crimes are also listed below.

Robbery 
The robbery rate in Latvia in 2018 was 27.7 cases per 100,000, a decrease from 108.3 cases per 100,000 people in 2004. Over the two years ranging from 2018-2020, at least 10 warehouses of trading and production have been said to be robbed.

Homicide 

Homicide in Latvia has been seeing upticks recently. In 2019, a study conducted by Eurostat revealed that the three Baltic states had the highest homicide rate in Europe in that year: Latvia had the highest, followed by Lithuania and Estonia, with 4.7 out of 100,000 Latvians being murdered yearly.

Drug use 
According to Euronews, Latvia, along with Italy and the United Kingdom, have the worst rankings in drug usage. The most common illicit drug used by Latvians is cannabis, used by young adults aged 15–34, and specifically by males. Cocaine and ecstasy are also commonly used by Latvians. Drug trafficking is also common in Latvia.

Originally, in the 1970s and 80s, drugs were produced at home, but from the 1990s onward, organized crime started manufacturing illegally-produced drugs, like LSD, ecstasy, cocaine and amphetamines. However, very few people are willing to take medicine for it.

Corruption 

Corruption is considered a serious issue in Latvia. Transparency International gave Latvia 42 out of a rank of 180 in corruption in 2020, an increase by 2 places compared to 2019. The Corruption Prevention and Combating Bureau (KNAB) is the main anti-corruption agency in Latvia. In a report by Reuters, that former Bank of Latvia Governor Ilmārs Rimšēvičs had been detained in prison for accepting a bribe of 500,000 euro bribe from Latvian bank ABLV. Frequently, people from other countries, like Russia, have money laundering schemes based in Latvia.

Organized crime 
Organized crime in Latvia is common, particularly due to Latvia's position in the European continent. Illegal immigration, human trafficking, and corruption are problems that organized crime groups in Latvia take advantage of frequently. As of 2014, 70 organized crime groups operate in Latvia.

Illegal immigration 

Illegal immigration is common issue in Latvia. The main origin countries of illegal immigrants are Russia, Belarus, Ukraine, and Moldova, and from as far as Iraq, Iran, Bangladesh, Vietnam, and Afghanistan. Latvia, along with Lithuania and Poland, claims that Belarus has been using illegal immigrants from war-torn countries like Iraq as a way to pressure the European Union into lifting its sanctions on Belarus, and as such has declared a state of emergency along the Belarus–Latvia border.

There were 665 refugees in Latvia in 2019, 237,966 migrants, and 181 new asylum applications in 2019; in 2021, Latvia revealed it had detained 1,000 migrants, mostly from Iraq, Afghanistan and other Middle Eastern countries along the Belarus-Latvia border.

Efforts to prevent crime 

The Latvian State Police (Latvijas Valsts policija, VP) is the official national police agency of Latvia. It is also helped by organizations it is a member of, like Interpol and Europol. Latvia is also signatory to the terms of the Treaty of Lisbon, which ensures that all EU member states allow free right of immigration, asylum, and are expected to work together to combat crime. In September 2014, Latvian police participated in "Operation Archimedes", an effort organized by Europol to hunt down a cargo train sending stolen cars to Tajikistan.

References